Alternative libertaire (AL, "Libertarian Alternative") was a French anarchist organization formed in 1991 which publishes a monthly magazine, actively participates in a variety of social movements, and is a participant in the Anarkismo.net project. In 2019 the organization merged into the Union Communiste Libertaire (UCL, "Libertarian Communist Union")

Alternative Libertaire, now UCL, identifies with various tendencies within the libertarian socialist current of anarchism including anarcho-communism and anarcho-syndicalism. It was also a member of the International Libertarian Solidarity network.

Ideology
The organization identifies with the revolutionary workers' movement drawn from the split in the First International (the International Workingmens' Association) in 1872.  This was in opposition to the Marxists, whom Mikhail Bakunin regarded as authoritarian.

Alternative Libertaire's practical and ideological background has been summed up by the organisation as continuing from the following groups:
 Bakunin and his supporters within the First International.
 The revolutionary syndicalists of the French CGT before 1914.
 The Makhnovists, and the Organizational Platform proposed by the exiled Russian anarchists.
 Spanish anarcho-syndicalism, the Spanish Revolution 1936 and in particular the actions of the Friends of Durruti group.
 The Libertarian Communist Federation (FCL) and the Libertarian Communist Manifesto by Georges Fontenis in 1954.
 The Union des travailleurs communistes libertaires (Libertarian Communist Workers’ Union, UTCL), the works of Daniel Guérin and the Libertarian Communist Project of 1986.

Activity

Today Alternative Libertaire is developing its political action on two fronts:
 The building of an alliance of social movements, to give political weight to the politics of the people against the institutionalised left.
 The building of a libertarian communist current which fuels and is fuelled by the activities of the social movements.

AL militants are particularly involved in struggles in the workplace and in the unions, in the CGT or in SUD (sometimes in the CNT), in the fight against unemployment, for the right to housing, in the environmental movement and in the fight against patriarchy. Alternative Libertaire endeavours to link these conflicts in today’s society with the perspective of a break with capitalism and the state.

References

External links 
  

1991 establishments in France
Far-left politics in France
Defunct anarchist organizations in France
Libertarian socialist organizations
Defunct platformist organizations
Anarchism in French Guiana
Anarchist Federations
Political organizations established in 1991
Political organizations disestablished in 2019